The Croce Rossa or Croix Rousse (both ) is a mountain of the Graian Alps, on the border between Piedmont, Italy and Savoie, France.

Features 
The mountain lies at the head of the Viù Valley in the Lanzo Valleys. It has a height of 3,566m and was first climbed in 1857 by A Tonini. There is a statue of the Madonna on its summit.

Mountain huts 
 Refuge d'Avérole - 2,210 m;
 Rifugio Luigi Cibrario - 2,616 m.

Maps

 Istituto Geografico Militare (IGM) official maps of Italy, 1:25.000 and 1:100.000 scale, on-line version
 Istituto Geografico Centrale (IGC) - Carta dei sentieri e dei rifugi scala 1:50.000 n. 2 Valli di Lanzo e Moncenisio
 Istituto Geografico Centrale - Carta dei sentieri e dei rifugi scala 1:25.000 n.110 Alte Valli di Lanzo (Rocciamelone - Uja di Ciamarella - Le Levanne)

References

Mountains of the Alps
Alpine three-thousanders
Mountains of Piedmont
Mountains of Savoie
International mountains of Europe
France–Italy border
Mountains partially in France